The Mountain Masochist Trail Run (MMTR50) is a  ultramarathon that winds its way through the Blue Ridge Mountains. The course begins at the James River Visitor Center; runners cover a short out-and-back section on the Blue Ridge Parkway before completing a few short miles of road. The course then meanders northward over various dirt and gravel roads in the National Forest before runners have to negotiate the second half of the course. Leaving Long Mountain aid station, the second half includes dirt and old logging roads as well as several miles of single-track trail. Many say the race is just beginning when you leave Long Mountain. Upon reaching the last aid station at Porters Ridge, runners course downhill for 2.9 miles toward the finish in Montebello. The entire MMTR course traverses some of the most beautiful areas in the Blue Ridge right around peak fall foliage. The elevation climbs 9,200 feet and descends 7,000 feet.

Top finishes

Top ten men performers
      2009    Geoff Roes      6:27:55
	2003	Dave Mackey	6:48:31
	2001	Clark Zealand	6:52:11
	2006	Eric Grossman	6:53:18
	2004	Sean Andrish	6:56:09
	1997	Josh Cox	6:57:10
      2009    Lon Freeman     6:58:25
	1996	Courtney Campbell	6:59:26
	2005	Paul DeWitt	6:59:52
     2009    Gary Robbins    7:00:28

Top ten women performers
	2006	Nikki Kimball	7:47:05
       2005	Anne Lundblad	7:49:48
	2005	Annette Bednosky	7:55:52
	2006	Jenn Shelton	7:58:11
       2009    Tamsin Anstey   8:09:07
	2005	Cat Phillips	8:13:15
	2003	Bethany Hunter	8:14:47
	2003	Jenny Capel	8:23:35
	1994	Janice Anderson	8:27:01
	2004	Anthea Schmid	8:27:30

External links
 Official Site of the Mountain Masochist Trail Run 50 miler
 3D Course Flyover of the Mountain Masochist

Ultramarathons in the United States
Blue Ridge Mountains